Achatinella sowerbyana is a species of air-breathing land snail, a terrestrial pulmonate gastropod mollusk in the family Achatinellidae. This species is endemic to Hawaii.

Shell description
The sinistral or dextral shell is imperforate, conic-oblong and solid. The shell has 6 whorls. The spire is slightly convexly-conic and the apex subacute. The suture is margined and the whorls are slightly convex. The glossy color is tawny buff and slightly streaked with a deeper shade. The aperture is oblique and white within. The strong columellar fold is superior, twisted, and roseate. The peristome is rose-lipped with the outer margin
shortly expanded and columellar margin dilated and adnate.

The height of the shell is 18.0 mm. The width of the shell is 9.0 mm.

References
This article incorporates public domain text (a public domain work of the United States Government) from reference.

sowerbyana
Molluscs of Hawaii
Endemic fauna of Hawaii
Critically endangered fauna of the United States
Gastropods described in 1855
Taxonomy articles created by Polbot